This is a list of the National Register of Historic Places listings in Burnet County, Texas.

This is intended to be a complete list of properties and districts listed on the National Register of Historic Places in Burnet County, Texas. There are two districts and six individual properties listed on the National Register in the county. Two properties and one site within one district are designated as Recorded Texas Historic Landmarks.

Current listings

The publicly disclosed locations of National Register properties and districts may be seen in a mapping service provided.

|}

See also

National Register of Historic Places listings in Texas
Recorded Texas Historic Landmarks in Burnet County

References

External links

Registered Historic Places
Burnet County